The Dominican slider (Trachemys stejnegeri vicina)  is a subspecies of turtle in the family Emydidae.
It is endemic to the island of Hispaniola (split between the Dominican Republic and Haiti).

References 

Bibliography

Trachemys
Endemic fauna of Hispaniola
Reptiles of the Dominican Republic
Reptiles of Haiti